The High Sheriff of Westmeath was the British Crown's judicial representative in County Westmeath, Ireland from its creation under The Counties of Meath and Westmeath Act 1543 until 1922, when the office was abolished in the new Free State and replaced by the office of Westmeath County Sheriff. The sheriff had judicial, electoral, ceremonial and administrative functions and executed High Court Writs. In 1908, an Order in Council made the Lord-Lieutenant the Sovereign's prime representative in a county and reduced the High Sheriff's precedence. However the sheriff retained his responsibilities for the preservation of law and order in the county. The usual procedure for appointing the sheriff from 1660 onwards was that three persons were nominated at the beginning of each year from the county and the Lord Lieutenant then appointed his choice as High Sheriff for the remainder of the year. Often the other nominees were appointed as under-sheriffs. Sometimes a sheriff did not fulfil his entire term through death or other event and another sheriff was then appointed for the remainder of the year. The dates given hereunder are the dates of appointment. The following is an incomplete list: all addresses are in County Westmeath unless stated otherwise.

High Sheriffs of County Westmeath
1543: Robert Dillon
1557: Sir Oliver Nugent 
1558: Sir Thomas le Strange
1572–1573: Thomas Nugent
1574: Thomas mac Riccard Tute of Sonnagh
1606–1612: Sir Edmund Fettiplace
1642: Edward Tuite, of Tuitestown  (killed in battle, 1642)
1655: James Shaen
1661: Ridgeley Hatfield
1663: Charles Lyons
1677: Sir Edward Tyrrell
1692: Walter Pollard, jnr 
1698: Ralph Elrington, of Killeenbrack

Anne, 1702–1714
1703: Edward Bertles
1705: Thomas Magan, of Togherstown 
1709: Richard Plummer

George I, 1714–1727
1715: Thomas Judge, of Grangebegg 
1718: Arthur Reynell, of Castle Reynell 
1720: Richard Berry, of Wardenstown
1721: Arthur Judge, of Bishopstone and later of Mosstown 
1727: Arthur Reynell, of Castle Reynell

George II, 1727–1760

1728: Hon. Humphrey Butler of Belturbet
1729: Herbert Price
1729: Major Charles Hampson (died 1729)
1730: Herbert Price
1731: Charles Lyons of Ledeston Hall
1732: Hugh Wilton
1733: Sir Henry Tuite, 6th Baronet of Sonagh
1734: William Handcock
1735: John Gay
1736: Judge Rochfort
1737: William Sherlock
1738: Henry Pilkington, of Tore  
1739: Ebenezer Lowe
1740: Nicholas Ogle
1741: Thomas Pakenham
1742: Edmond Hill
1743: Robert Cooke
1744: Isaac Smith
1745: Edmond Reynell
1746: Thomas Smyth, of Drumcree
1747: Hans Widman Wood, of Rosmead
1748: John Smith
1748: John Meares, of Meares Court 
1749: Edward Magan
1750: Arthur Judge
1751: Benjamin Chapman
1752: Morgan Daly
1753: Duke Tyrrell
1754: Hugh Maguire
1755: Samuel Lowe
1756: Edmond Malone, of Baronston
1757: Edmond Malone, of Baronston
1758: John Nugent
1759: Arthur Magan, of Clonearl  
1760: Richard Sterne Tighe

George III, 1760–1820

1761: Thomas Adderly
1762: Hon. George Augustus Rochfort, Lord Belfield (later 2nd Earl of Belvedere)
1763: Brinsley Butler, Hon. Lord Newtown
1764: Sir Richard Levinge, 4th Baronet
1765: Hon. Richard Rochfort Mervyn
1766: Ralph Smith
1767: Joseph Daly
1768: Daniel Chenevix
1769: George Boleyn Whitney
1770: William Smyth, of Fieldstown  
1771: Thomas Fetherstonhaugh  
1772: George Paul Monk
1773: Peter Delemar
1774: Sir William Pigot Piers, 5th Baronet
1775: George Tyrrell
1776: Robert Hodson, 1st Baronet. of Tuitestown (now Greenpark)
1777: Hon. Robert Rochfort
1778: John Lyons of Ledeston Hall
1779: John Reynell
1780: Richard Malone
1781: Cuthbert Fetherstonhaugh, of Mosstown  
1782: William Fetherstonhaugh  
1783: John Meares, of Meares Court
1784: James Fetherstonhaugh, of Bracklyn Castle  
1785: Hon. Robert Moore
1786: Henry Widman Wood
1787: Philip Batty
1788: Henry Purdon
1789: Mark Synnott (died 1789) and replaced by James Caulfield Browne
1790: Ralph Smyth, of Gaybrook  
1791: Sir Charles Levinge, 5th Baronet
1792: Thomas Hutchinson Smyth
1793: William Smyth, of Barbavilla
1794: Sterne Tighe, of Carrick
1795: Henry Cope
1796: Gustavus Hume Rochfort, of Rochfort
1797: Maurice Nugent O'Connor, of Mount Pleasant  
1798: Dillon Pollard
1799: James Nugent, of Clonlost
1800: Edward John Briscoe, of Riverdale
1801: Thomas Fitzgerald Nugent
1802: Alexander Murray
1803: Joseph Morgan Daly
1804: Henry Daniel
1805: Theobald Fetherstonhaugh, of Mosstown  
1806: Robert Cooke
1807: James Gibbons
1808: Sir Richard Levinge, 6th Baronet
1809: George Purdon
1810: Walter Nugent
1811: Robert Purdon
1812: William Dutton Pollard, of Kinturk and Castle Pollard 
1813: Ralph Smyth, of Glananea  
1814: John Middleton Berry, of Middleton
1815: Robert Handcock Temple, of Waterstown
1816: John Charles Lyons of Ledeston Hall
1817: James Gibbons, jnr
1818: Peter Purdon
1819: Richard M. Reynell
1820: William Henry Magan

George IV, 1820–1830

1821: Richard Handcock, Junior
1822: Hugh Morgan Tuite, later of Sonna
1823: Robert Smyth, of Drumcree
1824: Thomas James Fetherstonhaugh, of Bracklyn Castle
1825: Anthony J. Doppling, of Lowtown
1826: Thomas Shugburgh Whitney, of Newpass
1827: Sir Robert Arair Hodson, 2nd Bt., of Holybrooke House, co. Wicklow
1828: Daniel or David James Hearne
1829: Gustavus Lambert
1830: Robert Smyth, of Gaybrook

William IV, 1830–1837

1831: Hon. Augustus Caulfeild Browne
1832: William Barlow Smythe, of Barbavilla
1833: Edward Briscoe, of Grangemore 
1834: R. W. Cooper
1835: Sir Percy Fitzgerald Nugent, 1st Bt., of Donore
1836: William Chapman of Killua Casle, Athboy 
1837: John Ennis

Victoria, 1837–1901

1838: James Nugent, Count of Holy Roman Empire
1839: Richard Winter Reynell, of Killynon
1840: William Pollard, of Kinturk 
1841: Cuthbert Fetherstonhaugh, of Mosstown  
1842: Hercules Robinson, R.N., of Rosmead
1843: George Augustus Boyd, of Middleton Park House
1844: Sir Montague Lowther Chapman, 3rd Bt., of Killua Castle
1845: Hon. Laurence Harman King-Harman, of Newcastle
1846: Hon. Laurence Harman King-Harman and Sir George Frederick John Hodson, 3rd Bt., of Holybrooke House, co. Wicklow
1847: Richard Steel Fetherston-Haugh
1848: James William Middleton Barry, of Ballinagall, Mullingar 
1849: Lt-Col. John Caulfeild, of Bloomfield
1850: Sir John Hugh Nugent, 3rd Bt., of Ballinlough
1851: Sir Richard George Augustus Levinge, 7th Bt.
1852: John Richard Malone, of Baronston  
1853: Charles Brinsley Marlay (later Rochfort), of Belvedere
1854: Sir Francis Hopkins, 2nd Bt., of Athboy 
1855: John James Nugent
1856: Sir Benjamin James Chapman, 4th Bt., of Killua Castle
1857: Howard Fetherstonhaugh, of Bracklyn Castle
1858: Thomas James Smyth, of Ballynegall
1859: John Longworth, of Glynwood
1860: Hon. Robert Reginald Temple Harris
1861: Hon. Henry William Parnell, later 3rd Baron Congleton
1862: John Devenish Meares, of Meares Court, Moyvore
1863:
1864: John Wilson, of Daramona House  
1865:
1866: John James Ennis (later 2nd Bt.), of Ballinahown Court, Athlone.
1867: Francis Hume Kelly, of Glencara
1868: Joseph Tuite, of Sonna.
1869:
1870: Hon. Francis William Browne, of Galston Park, Killican. (later 4th Baron Kilmaine)
1871: Hon. George Mostyn.
1872: George Nugent Purdon, of Lisnabin.
1872: Hon. Sir Leicester Curzon Smyth.
1873: Walter William Dutton Pollard-Urquhart, of Castle Pollard.
1874: James Corry Jones Lowry, of Rockdale.
1875: Joshua Harry Cooper.
1876: Major Rochfort Hamilton Boyd-Rochfort, of Middleton Park, Castletown.
1877: William Benjamin Digby, of Ballincurra.
1878: William Edward Smyth, of Glananea.
1879:
1880: Captain Crofton Thomas Burton Vandeleur, of Wordenstown.
1881: Henry Loftus Lewis, of Violetstown.
1882: Francis Travers Dames-Longworth, Q.C., of Glynwood.
1883: Charles Kelly, of Lunestown.
1884: Hon. Patrick Emilius John Greville-Nugent, of Clonyn Castle
1885: William Lewis Devenish-Meares, of Meares Court.
1886: Harry Corbyn Levinge, of Knockdrin Castle.
1887: Henry Ernest William Fetherstonhaugh-Whitney, of Newpass.
1888: William Lyster Smythe.
1889: Sir Montagu Richard Chapman, 5th Bt., of Killua Castle
1890: Cecil Howard Digby Fetherstonhaugh, of Bracklyn Castle.
1891: Francis Vansittart Chapman
1892: Col. James Smyth, of Gaybrook.
1893: William Evans Esq, Gillardstown, Killucan.
1894: William Edward Wilson, FRS, of Daramona.
1895: William Bury Homan-Mulock.
1896: Col. John Richard Malone, of Baronston.
1897: Henry Arthur Shuckburgh Upton, of Coolatore, Moate.(1870–1947)
1898:
1899: Captain the Hon. Ronald Fulke Greville.
1900: Edward Travers Dames-Longworth, of Glynwood
1901: Lt-Col. Francis Edward Romulus Pollard-Urquhart, of Castle Pollard

Edward VII, 1901–1910

1902: Richard William Winter Bayley, of Ballinderry.
1903: Edward Kenrick Bunbury Tighe.
1904: George Arthur Boyd-Rochfort, of Middleton Park.
1905: John David Fetherstonhaugh, of Rockview.
1906: Charles Brinsley Marlay (later Rochfort), of Belvedere.
1907: Hugh Ponsonby Wilson, of Coolure.
1908: Sir Richard William Levinge, 10th Bt.
1909: Major Gerald Dease, Turbotston.
1910: Gustavus Rochfort Wade (later Hyde), of Lynnbury.

George V, 1910–1922

1911: John Granville Wilson, of Daramona House.
1912: Joseph Leycester Devenish-Meares, of Meares Court.
1913: Robert Wolfe Smyth, of Portlick Castle.
1914:
1915: Henry Maurice Tuite, of Sonna.
1916: Col. Edward Winter Purdon-Winter, of Lisnabin.
1917: Major Thomas Gibbons Hawkesworth Smyth, of Ballynegall.
1918: Henry Maxwell Smyth, of Drumcree House.
1919: Captain Percy Philip O'Reilly, of Colamber.
1920: Major Patrick Henry Augustus O'Hara, of Mornington.
1921:
1922: Sir Walter Richard Nugent, 4th Bt.

References
 [The Grand Juries of the County of Westmeath from the Year 1727 to the Year 1853 with an Historical Appendix, published by John Charles Lyons on the Ledestown Press in 1853.]

 
History of County Westmeath
Westmeath